Gastonia Municipal Airport  is a city-owned, public-use airport located four nautical miles (5 mi, 7 km) south of the central business district of Gastonia, a city in Gaston County, North Carolina, United States. It is included in the National Plan of Integrated Airport Systems for 2011–2015, which categorized it as a general aviation facility.

This airport is assigned a three-letter location identifier of AKH by the Federal Aviation Administration, but it does not have an International Air Transport Association (IATA) airport code (the IATA assigned AKH to Prince Sultan Air Base in Al Kharj, Saudi Arabia).

Facilities and aircraft 
Gastonia Municipal Airport covers an area of 280 acres (113 ha) at an elevation of 798 feet (243 m) above mean sea level. It has one runway designated 3/21 with an asphalt surface measuring 3,770 by 100 feet (1,149 x 30 m).

For the 12-month period ending June 26, 2009, the airport had 50,040 aircraft operations, an average of 137 per day: 97.9% general aviation, 2% air taxi, and <1% military.
At that time there were 36 aircraft based at this airport: 78% single-engine, 19% multi-engine, and 3% jet.

References

External links 
 Gastonia Municipal Airport, official page
  at North Carolina DOT airport guide
 Aerial image as of March 1999 from USGS The National Map
 

Airports in North Carolina
Gastonia, North Carolina
Transportation in Gaston County, North Carolina
Buildings and structures in Gaston County, North Carolina